Hemithrinax compacta is a species of palm that is endemic to Cuba.

Distribution and habitat
Hemithrinax compacta flourishes on the mogotes of Cuba. Mogotes are dome-shaped hills in Cuba made up of coral rock.

Description
The genus Thrinax has been grown in gardens. In addition, in Thrinax the fruits are dispersed and eaten by West Indian woodpeckers and other birds, gray squirrels and lizards.

References

compacta
Trees of Cuba
Endemic flora of Cuba